Gugarchin may refer to:
 Gugarchin, Ardabil
 Gugarchin, East Azerbaijan